Lautém is one of the municipalities (formerly districts) of East Timor, at the eastern end of the country. It has a population of 64,135 (census 2010) and an area of 1,813 km². Its capital is Lospalos, which lies 248 km east of the national capital, Dili.

Etymology
The word Lautém is a Portuguese approximation of the local Fataluku language word Lauteinu. That word, in turn, is a portmanteau of the Fataluku words lau ('cloth') und tein ('sacred'), ie 'sacred cloth'. The mythical ancestors of today's municipal population were known as Lauteinu or Lauteira.

Geography
To the west the municipality borders the municipalities of Baucau and Viqueque. To the north lies the Banda Sea, and to the south the Timor Sea. The municipality also includes the easternmost point of the island, Cape Cutcha in the administrative post of Tutuala, and the small island Jaco.

The borders of the municipality of Lautém are identical to those of the council of the same name in Portuguese Timor. At that time, many of the localities had Portuguese names, such as Vila Nova de Malaca (today Lautém), Nova Nazaré (Com), Nova Sagres (Tutuala) and Nova Âncora (Laivai).

Lautém has beautiful sand beaches and a wild, mountainous, and raw rugged unspoilt landscape. Many of the endemic birds of East Timor live here. Near the city of Lautém there are cave drawings. Numerous stone sarcophagi and animistic shrines are found throughout the district.

Lautém municipality is known for its birding (birds of East Timor). Its municipal flag has the head of a yellow-crested cockatoo.

Administrative posts
The municipality's administrative posts (formerly sub-districts) are:
Iliomar
Lautém
Lospalos
Luro
Tutuala

Demographics
In addition to the official languages of Portuguese and Tetum, in the municipality there are 30,000 speakers of the Papuan language Fataluku, mainly in the east of the district, many of whom do not speak a second language.

References

Notes

Bibliography

External links

  – official site (in Tetum with some content in English)
  – information page on Ministry of State Administration site 
 Fataluku language website
 Ethnologue page for Fataluku

 
Municipalities of East Timor